Jagadguru Aadisankaran is a 1977 Indian Malayalam film, directed and produced by P. Bhaskaran. The film stars Muralimohan, Kaviyoor Ponnamma, O. Ramdas and Sankaradi in the lead roles. The story revolves around the life, philosophies and miracles of 8th century saint Adi Shankara.

Cast
 
Murali Mohan as Adi Shankara 
Kaviyoor Ponnamma as Kaippilly Aryadevi Antarjanam, Mother of Sankaracharyar 
Manjeri Chandran as Lord Shiva
Sankaradi as Moorkkathu Namboothiri
Prathapachandran as Vishnusharma/Sanandan/Padmapada 
C. R. Lakshmi as Omana/Moorkhan's wife
Mallika Sukumaran as Goddess Saraswati
Master Raghu as Young Adi Shankara
N. Govindankutty as Pathala Bhairavan 
Pala Thankam as the poor Lady who donates Amla (Gooseberry)
Panjabi as Vengu
Premji as Kaipilly Shivaguru Nambudiri, Father of Sankaracharyar 
Rajakokila as Maharani
T. P. Madhavan as Govinda Guru
Thodupuzha Radhakrishnan as Ugrabhairava
Sreemoolanagaram Vijayan as Amaravi Raja
Vallathol Unnikrishnan as Mandalakesha/Sureshwara
Dashaavathaaram Ravikumar as Kumaralbhaktha
P. R. Menon as Vyasa
J. A. R. Anand as Velu

Soundtrack
The film has musical score by V. Dakshinamoorthy. K. J. Yesudas won the Kerala State Film Award for Best Singer for the song "Sankara Digvijayam".

References

External links
 

1977 films
1970s Malayalam-language films
Adi Shankara
Films directed by P. Bhaskaran